John Pendlebury (born 18 April 1961) is an English former professional rugby league footballer who played in the 1970s, 1980s and 1990s, and coached in the 1990s.

Background
John Pendlebury was born in Leigh, Lancashire, England.

Playing career
Pendlebury played  in Wigan's 6-19 defeat by Widnes in the 1984 Challenge Cup Final during the 1983–84 season at Wembley Stadium, London on Saturday 5 May 1984,  in front of a crowd of 80,116, played  scored a drop goal, and made a last-gasp tackle on Mark Elia in Halifax's 19-18 victory over St. Helens in the 1987 Challenge Cup Final during the 1986–87 season at Wembley Stadium, London on Saturday 2 May 1987, in front of a crowd of 91,267, and played  the 12-32 defeat by Wigan in the 1988 Challenge Cup Final during the 1987–88 season at Wembley Stadium, London on Saturday 30 April 1988, in front of a crowd of 94,273.

Pendlebury played  in Wigan's 15-4 victory over Leeds in the 1982–83 John Player Trophy Final during the 1982–83 season at Elland Road, Leeds on Saturday 22 January 1983.

Pendlebury played  (replaced by interchange/substitute Malcolm Smith ) in Wigan's 10-26 defeat by Warrington in the 1980 Lancashire Cup Final during the 1980–81 season at Knowsley Road, St. Helens on Saturday 4 October 1980, played as an interchange/substitute, i.e. number 14, (replacing  Henderson Gill) in the 18-26 defeat by St. Helens in the 1984 Lancashire Cup Final during the 1984–85 season at Central Park, Wigan on Sunday 28 October 1984, played  in Bradford Northern's 20-14 victory over Featherstone Rovers in the 1989 Yorkshire Cup Final during the 1989–90 season at Headingley, Leeds on Sunday 5 November 1989, and played , and was captain in the 2-12 defeat by Warrington in the 1990–91 Regal Trophy Final during the 1990–91 season at Headingley, Leeds on Saturday 12 January 1991.

Pendlebury coached the Halifax Blue Sox in 1997's Super League II, and in 1998's Super League III.

References

External links
Statistics at wigan.rlfans.com
Photograph "John Pendlebury" at rlhp.co.uk

1961 births
Living people
Bradford Bulls players
English rugby league coaches
English rugby league players
Halifax R.L.F.C. coaches
Halifax R.L.F.C. players
Lancashire rugby league team players
Leigh Leopards captains
Leigh Leopards players
Oldham R.L.F.C. coaches
Rugby league halfbacks
Rugby league hookers
Rugby league players from Leigh, Greater Manchester
Rugby league locks
Salford Red Devils players
Wigan Warriors players